Guzhen International Lighting Fair is a trade show for lighting fixtures in Guangdong, China.

History
 The 16th fair October 2015 22–26 was held in Zhongshan City, Guangdong Province in the oldTown Convention and Exhibition center.
 The 15th fare was at the Convention and Exhibition Center
 The 13 Fair was held in the conference and Expo center.
 The 13th fair was held in 2013 in Zhongshan Cit.
 From October 18, 2013 to 21, the ancient town of twelfth town lights Fair

References

1982 establishments in China
Online retailers of China